Narasimaiah Seshagiri (10 May 1940 – 26 May 2013) was an Indian computer scientist, writer and a former director-general of the National Informatics Centre, an apex organization of the Government of India, handling its e-governance applications. He was a member of the Y2K Action Force of the Government, formed to combat the 9999 computer bug. He is credited with many publications which included The bomb! : fallout of India's nuclear explosion and Information systems for economies in transition. The Government of India awarded him the third highest civilian honour of the Padma Bhushan, in 2005, for his contributions to science and technology.

See also 
 National Informatics Centre

References 

Recipients of the Padma Bhushan in science & engineering
1941 births
Indian computer scientists
Indian technology writers
Living people
Place of birth missing (living people)
20th-century Indian non-fiction writers